Michael Llewellyn may refer to:

Mike Llewellyn, cricketer
Sir Michael Llewellyn, 2nd Baronet (1921-1994) of the Llewellyn baronets
Michael Llewellyn (rugby), in 2008–09 Rugby-Bundesliga squads

See also
Michael Llewellyn-Smith, diplomat